Yunnanilus tigerivinus is a species of stone loach which is endemic to China. Its type locality is an opening of an underground channel in a suburb of Kunming in Yunnan. Some authorities consider Y. tigerivinus to be a junior synonym of Yunnanilus pleurotaenia .

References

T
Fish described in 1999